Horah Al-Horah Reserve is a nature reserve area in Saudi Arabia managed by the Saudi Wildlife Authority and is one of the first reserves established by the authority in 1987.

Overview 
The reserve occupies approximately 13,775 km2 and its surface consists of a volcanic plateau rich in black basaltic rocks and includes a range of low volcanic mountains with heights between 800 and 1,150 meters above sea level

Flora and wildlife 
Horah Al-Horah Reserve is characterised by diverse vegetation, consisting of perennial and annual plants scattered in the torrent streams and its sides. Flora variations include Lycium Shawii, Tamarix, Arabian Calligonum as well as a plethora of Annual Plants. It is also habitat to the Arabian Wolf, Red Fox, Desert Fox, Goitered Gazelle, Striped Hyena, Hare and Jerboa. As for birds, the reserve is home to Chlamydotis, Golden Eagle, Curlews and nine species of Alauda, in addition to a number of migratory birds. There are some reptile species that live in the protected area as well

See also 
 List of protected areas of Saudi Arabia

References 

Protected areas of Saudi Arabia
Wildlife sanctuaries
Nature reserves in Saudi Arabia